Egalicia is a genus of longhorn beetles of the subfamily Lamiinae, containing the following species:

 Egalicia flavescens (Thomson, 1864)
 Egalicia testacea (Bates, 1866)

References

Hemilophini